The Al Naslaa rock is a landform 50 km south of the Tayma oasis in Saudi Arabia. It is split down the middle into two parts, both balanced on small pedestals. The overall shape of the rock may be due to wind erosion and chemical weathering that could have been possible due to the moist conditions in the protected underside of the rock. It is split in two by what could be a joint, although the probability of it being that is questionable.

The rock is about 6 metres high and 9 metres wide, and is covered on its south-east face with numerous petroglyphs.

References 

Archaeological sites in Saudi Arabia
Rock art in Saudi Arabia
Rock formations of Saudi Arabia
Petroglyphs
Tabuk Province